Leninshil Zhas (Lenınshil jas; meaning Lenin's Youth in English) was a newspaper published by the Komsomol of the Kazakh SSR five times a week. The paper was the successor of Zhas kairat, a newspaper established in Tashkent in 1921.

Leninshil Zhas was based in Alma Ata. The paper targeted Kazakh youth.

References

External links
Leninshil Zhas history

Defunct newspapers published in Kazakhstan
Communist newspapers
Eastern Bloc mass media
Komsomol
Mass media in Almaty
Newspapers published in the Soviet Union
Publications with year of establishment missing
Russian-language newspapers published in Kazakhstan